Moosehead Lake is a deep, coldwater lake located in Piscataquis County in Northwestern Maine. It is the second-largest lake in New England, and the largest mountain lake in the eastern United States. Situated in the mostly undeveloped Longfellow Mountains, the lake is the source of the Kennebec River. Several rural Townships border the lake. Greenville is by far the largest town on the lake, with a small downtown area that has banks, shops, and restaurants. There are over 80 islands in the lake, the largest being Sugar Island and Deer Island to the west being the second largest.

History

Mount Kineo, with  cliffs rising straight up from Moosehead Lake, has attracted visitors for centuries, from early American Indians (Red Paint People), to later tribes seeking its rhyolite to make stone tools, Penobscots and Norridgewocks, the Abenaki bands who battled here with their enemy the Mohawks, to 19th-century "rusticators" traveling by railroad and steamboat and today's hotel guests. Various species dwell among its cliffs and talus slopes, including peregrine falcons and rare plants.

The Moosehead region includes the headwaters of the Kennebec, the West Branch of the Penobscot, the Piscataquis, the Pleasant, and the Saint John rivers. Henry David Thoreau and other 19th-century visitors remarked on the beauty of the area. The region has a large moose population; moose outnumber people 3:1. However, the name of the region derives from the remarkable similarity between maps of the lake and an antlered moose.

Henry David Thoreau described the lake as “...a gleaming silver platter at the end of the table.”

Geography

, with an area of nearly 118 mile² (approx.
Its major inlet is the Moose River, which, east of Jackman, flows through Long Pond to Brassua Lake. To the east of Moosehead Lake, the Roach River is its second largest tributary. Flowing out of Moosehead Lake to the southwest are its east and west outlets—the Kennebec River.

The Moosehead Lake Region encompasses  of North Central Maine, and includes 127 incorporated and unincorporated townships in addition to Moosehead Lake. The total area of all standing surface waters in the region is more than  – 24% of the total area of lakes and ponds in Maine.

Climate
There is a weather station in the unincorporated namesake community of Moosehead on the middle part of the western lakeshore. The area has a humid continental climate (Köppen Dfb). Winters are cold and snowy, whereas summers are mild due to its relative elevation. Winter temperatures are similar to subarctic inland northern Sweden and Finland and as a result, boreal forests dominate the shoreline in spite of being in the mid-latitudes. Because of its cold climate, the lake becomes completely frozen over for about 5 months each year.

Development plans

Seattle-based Plum Creek Real Estate Investment Corporation, the largest private United States landowner, submitted a development proposal for the Moosehead region in April 2005. It was the largest development ever proposed for the state of Maine. 
The initial version of the scheme called for 975 house lots, two resorts, a golf course, a marina, three RV parks, and more than 100 rental cabins.  However, Plum Creek was defunct as of 2016 and all development plans have been cancelled.

In January 2021, a $75 million investment was made into developing the 1,700-acre Big Squaw Mountain Resort into a year-round tourist attraction that would include a new ski-lift system, a large hotel, lakefront condominiums, and a marina. The plans are being made by local developer Perry Williams, along with Louisiana-based developers at Provident Resources Group.

Notes

References

Further reading

External links
 Moosehead Lake Region Chamber of Commerce
 History of Moosehead Lake Region, Moosehead Historical Society
 Natural Resources Council of Maine
 The Moosehead Lake Region Resource Guide
 Land Use Regulation Committee - Concept Plan for Moosehead Lake Region
 Moosehead Lake Webcam

Lakes of Piscataquis County, Maine
Kennebec River
North Maine Woods
Northern Forest Canoe Trail
Lakes of Maine